Jeff Dunham: Controlled Chaos is a stage performance of comedian and ventriloquist Jeff Dunham. The show was taped in Landmark Theater, Richmond, Virginia, USA on June 3 and 4, 2011. The DVD was released on 25 September 2011 within the United States and 7 November 2011 in the United Kingdom. Controlled Chaos was one of the top 5 most-viewed programs on Comedy Central, premiering in front of an estimated 8.3 million viewers.

The Telegraph rated the DVD release 2/5 stars, calling Dunham's ventriloquist skills "impressive" but found some of his jokes neither appropriate nor funny. They also noted that, while the start of the show is relatively family-friendly, with Dunham discussing his childhood, the more show progresses the less family friendly it becomes.

Characters

 Walter - A grumpy old Vietnam war veteran with an attitude who frequently complains about his wife.
 Achmed the Dead Terrorist - The skeletal corpse of an incompetent suicide bomber, whom Dunham uses to satirize the contemporary issue of terrorism.
 Achmed Jr - The estranged son of Achmed. Controlled Chaos was his first onscreen appearance.
 Peanut - A purple woozle from Micronesia described by Walter as "a frickin' Muppet on crack." He wears one red Converse shoe on his left foot. In the first and second specials, he mocks José's accent, and his status on a stick, saying, "Maybe it was a horrible pogo accident. You know, doing-doing.... crriccck! Olé!" 
 José Jalapeño on a Stick - a jalapeño pepper on a stick, or "steek" as he says it with a Hispanic accent.
 Little Jeff - A miniature east coast version of Jeff himself. He appeared in Jeff Dunham: Controlled Chaos as a puppet that Peanut used when trying to do ventriloquism like Jeff.
 Bubba J - In Jeff's own words, "Pretty much just white-trash trailer-park." He talks about NASCAR and his love of beer. Though not actually featured in Dunham's live stage performance, Bubba J appears as the security guard stationed in the theater's vestibule to watch for Achmed's arrival; he attempts to park Achmed's hot-rod roadster, but in his greatly-inebriated state, only succeeds in blowing the car sky-high.

Certifications and sales

References

External links 

2011 direct-to-video films
2011 films
American comedy films
Stand-up comedy on DVD
2011 comedy films
2010s English-language films
2010s American films